Jafar Kashfi may refer to:
 Ja'far Kashfi, Persian philosopher of 19th century
 Seyyed Jafar Kashfi, Iranian calligrapher